Avul Pakir Jainulabdeen Abdul Kalam  (15 October 193127 July 2015) was an Indian aerospace scientist and statesman who served as the 11th president of India from 2002 to 2007. He was born and raised in Rameswaram, Tamil Nadu and studied physics and aerospace engineering. He spent the next four decades as a scientist and science administrator, mainly at the Defence Research and Development Organisation (DRDO) and Indian Space Research Organisation (ISRO) and was intimately involved in India's civilian space programme and military missile development efforts. He thus came to be known as the Missile Man of India for his work on the development of ballistic missile and launch vehicle technology. He also played a pivotal organisational, technical, and political role in India's Pokhran-II nuclear tests in 1998, the first since the original nuclear test by India in 1974.

Kalam was elected as the 11th president of India in 2002 with the support of both the ruling Bharatiya Janata Party and the then-opposition Indian National Congress. Widely referred to as the "People's President", he returned to his civilian life of education, writing and public service after a single term. He was a recipient of several prestigious awards, including the Bharat Ratna, India's highest civilian honour.

While delivering a lecture at the Indian Institute of Management Shillong, Kalam collapsed and died from an apparent cardiac arrest on 27 July 2015, aged 83. Thousands, including national-level dignitaries, attended the funeral ceremony held in his hometown of Rameswaram, where he was buried with full state honours.

Early life and education 
Avul Pakir Jainulabdeen Abdul Kalam was born on 15 October 1931, to a Tamil Muslim family in the pilgrimage centre of Rameswaram on Pamban Island, then in the Madras Presidency and now in the State of Tamil Nadu. His father Jainulabdeen Marakayar was a boat owner and imam of a local mosque; his mother Ashiamma was a housewife. His father owned a ferry that took Hindu pilgrims back and forth between Rameswaram and the now uninhabited Dhanushkodi. Kalam was the youngest of four brothers and one sister in his family. His ancestors had been wealthy Marakayar traders and landowners, with numerous properties and large tracts of land. Marakayar are a Muslim ethnic group found in coastal Tamil Nadu and Sri Lanka who claim descent from Arab traders and local women. The family business had involved trading groceries between the mainland and the island and to and from Sri Lanka, as well as ferrying pilgrims between the mainland and Pamban. With the opening of the Pamban Bridge to the mainland in 1914, however, the businesses failed and the family fortune and properties were lost by the 1920s, apart from the ancestral home. The family was poverty-stricken by the time Kalam was born. As a young boy he had to sell newspapers to add to the family's meager income. 

In his school years, Kalam had average grades but was described as a bright and hardworking student who had a strong desire to learn. He spent hours on his studies, especially mathematics. After completing his education at the Schwartz Higher Secondary School, Ramanathapuram, Kalam went on to attend Saint Joseph's College, Tiruchirappalli, then affiliated with the University of Madras, from where he graduated in physics in 1954.
He moved to Madras in 1955 to study aerospace engineering in Madras Institute of Technology. While Kalam was working on a senior class project, the Dean was dissatisfied with his lack of progress and threatened to revoke his scholarship unless the project was finished within the next three days. Kalam met the deadline, impressing the Dean, who later said to him, "I was putting you under stress and asking you to meet a difficult deadline." He narrowly missed achieving his dream of becoming a fighter pilot, as he placed ninth in qualifiers, and only eight positions were available in the IAF.

Career as a scientist 

After graduating from the Madras Institute of Technology in 1960, Kalam joined the Aeronautical Development Establishment of the Defence Research and Development Organisation (by Press Information Bureau, Government of India) as a scientist after becoming a member of the Defence Research & Development Service (DRDS). He started his career by designing a small hovercraft, but remained unconvinced by his choice of a job at DRDO. Kalam joined the INCOSPAR, working under Vikram Sarabhai, the renowned space scientist. He was interviewed and recruited into ISRO by H. G. S. Murthy, the first Director of  Thumba Equatorial Rocket Launching Station (TERLS). In 1969, Kalam was transferred to the Indian Space Research Organisation (ISRO) where he was the project director of India's first Satellite Launch Vehicle (SLV-III) which successfully deployed the Rohini satellite in near-earth orbit in July 1980; Kalam had first started work on an expandable rocket project independently at DRDO in 1965. In 1969, Kalam received the government's approval and expanded the programme to include more engineers.

In 1963 to 1964, he visited NASA's Langley Research Center in Hampton, Virginia; Goddard Space Flight Center in Greenbelt, Maryland; and Wallops Flight Facility. Between the 1970s and 1990s, Kalam made an effort to develop the Polar Satellite Launch Vehicle (PSLV) and SLV-III projects, both of which proved to be successful.

Kalam was invited by Raja Ramanna to witness the country's first nuclear test Smiling Buddha as the representative of TBRL, even though he had not participated in its development. In the 1970s, Kalam also directed two projects, Project Devil and Project Valiant, which sought to develop ballistic missiles from the technology of the successful SLV programme. Despite the disapproval of the Union Cabinet, Prime Minister Indira Gandhi allotted secret funds for these aerospace projects through her discretionary powers under Kalam's directorship. Kalam played an integral role convincing the Union Cabinet to conceal the true nature of these classified aerospace projects.
His research and educational leadership brought him great laurels and prestige in the 1980s, which prompted the government to initiate an advanced missile programme under his directorship. Kalam and Dr V S Arunachalam, metallurgist and scientific adviser to the Defence Minister, worked on the suggestion by the then Defence Minister, R. Venkataraman on a proposal for simultaneous development of a quiver of missiles instead of taking planned missiles one after another. R Venkatraman was instrumental in getting the cabinet approval for allocating  3.88 billion for the mission, named Integrated Guided Missile Development Programme (IGMDP) and appointed Kalam as the chief executive. Kalam played a major part in developing many missiles under the mission including Agni, an intermediate range ballistic missile and Prithvi, the tactical surface-to-surface missile, although the projects have been criticised for mismanagement and cost and time overruns.

Kalam served as the Chief Scientific Adviser to the Prime Minister and Secretary of the Defence Research and Development Organisation from July 1992 to December 1999. The Pokhran-II nuclear tests were conducted during this period in which he played an intensive political and technological role. Kalam served as the Chief Project Coordinator, along with Rajagopala Chidambaram, during the testing phase. Media coverage of Kalam during this period made him the country's best known nuclear scientist. However, the director of the site test, K Santhanam, said that the thermonuclear bomb had been a "fizzle" and criticised Kalam for issuing an incorrect report. Both Kalam and Chidambaram dismissed the claims.

In 1998, along with cardiologist Soma Raju, Kalam developed a low cost coronary stent, named the "Kalam-Raju Stent". In 2012, the duo designed a rugged tablet computer for health care in rural areas, which was named the "Kalam-Raju Tablet".

Presidency 

Kalam served as the 11th president of India, succeeding K. R. Narayanan. He won the 2002 presidential election with an electoral vote of 922,884, surpassing the 107,366 votes won by Lakshmi Sahgal. His term lasted from 25 July 2002, to 25 July 2007.

On 10 June 2002, the National Democratic Alliance (NDA) which was in power at the time, expressed that they would nominate Kalam for the post of President, and both the Samajwadi Party and the Nationalist Congress Party backed his candidacy. After the Samajwadi Party announced its support for Kalam, Narayanan chose not to seek a second term in office, leaving the field clear. Kalam said of the announcement of his candidature:

On 18 June, Kalam filed his nomination papers in the Indian Parliament, accompanied by Vajpayee and his senior Cabinet colleagues.

The polling for the presidential election began on 15 July 2002, in Parliament and the state assemblies, with the media claiming that the election was a one-sided affair and Kalam's victory was a foregone conclusion; the count was held on 18 July. Kalam became the 11th president of the Republic of India in an easy victory, and moved into the Rashtrapati Bhavan after he was sworn in on 25 July. Kalam was the third President of India to have been honoured with a Bharat Ratna, India's highest civilian honour, before becoming the President Sarvepalli Radhakrishnan (1954) and Zakir Hussain (1963) were the earlier recipients of Bharat Ratna who later became the President of India. He was also the first scientist and the first bachelor to occupy Rashtrapati Bhawan.

During his term as president, he was affectionately known as the People's President, saying that signing the Office of Profit Bill was the toughest decision he had taken during his tenure. Kalam was criticised for his inaction in deciding the fate of 20 out of the 21 mercy petitions submitted to him during his tenure. Article 72 of the Constitution of India empowers the President of India to grant pardons, and suspend or commute the death sentence of convicts on death row. Kalam acted on only one mercy plea in his five-year tenure as president, rejecting the plea of rapist Dhananjoy Chatterjee, who was later hanged. Perhaps the most notable plea was from Afzal Guru, a Kashmiri terrorist who was convicted of conspiracy in the December 2001 attack on the Indian Parliament and was sentenced to death by the Supreme Court of India in 2004. While the sentence was scheduled to be carried out on 20 October 2006, the pending action on his mercy plea resulted in him remaining on death row. He also took the controversial decision to impose President's Rule in Bihar in 2005.

In September 2003, in an interactive session in PGI Chandigarh, Kalam supported the need of Uniform Civil Code in India, keeping in view the population of the country.

At the end of his term, on 20 June 2007, Kalam expressed his willingness to consider a second term in office provided there was certainty about his victory in the 2007 presidential election. However, two days later, he decided not to contest the Presidential election again stating that he wanted to avoid involving Rashtrapati Bhavan from any political processes. He was proposed by third front named United National Progressive Alliance leader J. Jayalalithaa and coordinator Chandrababu Naidu other leaders Mulayam Singh Yadav and Om Prakash Chautala, but he did not have the support of the left parties, Shiv Sena and UPA constituents, to receive a renewed mandate.

Nearing the expiry of the term of the 12th President Pratibha Patil on 24 July 2012, media reports in April claimed that Kalam was likely to be nominated for his second term. After the reports, social networking sites witnessed a number of people supporting his candidature. The BJP potentially backed his nomination, saying that the party would lend their support if the Trinamool Congress, Samajwadi Party and Indian National Congress proposed him for the 2012 presidential election. A month ahead of the election, Mulayam Singh Yadav and Mamata Banerjee also expressed their support for Kalam. Days afterwards, Mulayam Singh Yadav backed out, leaving Mamata Banerjee as the solitary supporter. On 18 June 2012, Kalam declined to contest the 2012 presidential poll. He said of his decision not to do so:

Post-presidency 

After leaving office, Kalam became a visiting professor at the Indian Institute of Management Shillong, the Indian Institute of Management Ahmedabad, and the Indian Institute of Management Indore; an honorary fellow of Indian Institute of Science, Bangalore; chancellor of the Indian Institute of Space Science and Technology Thiruvananthapuram; professor of Aerospace Engineering at Anna University; and an adjunct at many other academic and research institutions across India. He taught information technology at the International Institute of Information Technology, Hyderabad, and technology at Banaras Hindu University and Anna University.

In 2011, Kalam was criticised by civil groups over his stand on the Koodankulam Nuclear Power Plant; he supported the establishment of the nuclear power plant and was accused of not speaking with the local people. The protesters were hostile to his visit as they saw him as a pro-nuclear scientist and were unimpressed by the assurances he provided regarding the safety features of the plant.

In May 2012, Kalam launched a programme for the youth of India called the What Can I Give Movement, with a central theme of defeating corruption.

Death 

On 27 July 2015, Kalam travelled to Shillong to deliver a lecture on "Creating a Livable Planet Earth" at the Indian Institute of Management Shillong. While climbing a flight of stairs, he experienced some discomfort, but was able to enter the auditorium after a brief rest. At around 6:35 p.m. IST, only five minutes into his lecture, he collapsed. He was rushed to the nearby Bethany Hospital in a critical condition; upon arrival, he lacked a pulse or any other signs of life. Despite being placed in the intensive care unit, Kalam was confirmed dead of a sudden cardiac arrest at 7:45p.m. IST. His last words, to his aide Srijan Pal Singh, were reportedly: "Funny guy! Are you doing well?"

Following his death, Kalam's body was airlifted in an Indian Air Force helicopter from Shillong to Guwahati, from where it was flown to New Delhi on the morning of 28 July in an air force C-130J Hercules. The flight landed at Palam Air Base that afternoon and was received by the President, the vice-president, the Prime Minister, Chief Minister of Delhi Arvind Kejriwal, and the three service chiefs of the Indian Armed Forces, who laid wreaths on Kalam's body. His body was then placed on a gun carriage draped with the Indian flag and taken to his Delhi residence at 10 Rajaji Marg; there, the public and numerous dignitaries paid homage, including former prime minister Manmohan Singh, Congress President Sonia Gandhi and Vice-president Rahul Gandhi, and Uttar Pradesh Chief Minister Akhilesh Yadav.

On the morning of 29 July, Kalam's body, wrapped in the Indian flag, was taken to Palam Air Base and flown to Madurai in an air force C-130J aircraft, arriving at Madurai Airport that afternoon. His body was received at the airport by the three service chiefs and national and state dignitaries, including cabinet ministers Manohar Parrikar, Venkaiah Naidu, Pon Radhakrishnan and the governors of Tamil Nadu and Meghalaya, K Rosaiah and V. Shanmuganathan. After a brief ceremony, Kalam's body was flown by air force helicopter to the town of Mandapam, from where it was taken in an army truck to his hometown of Rameswaram. Upon arriving at Rameswaram, his body was displayed in an open area in front of the local bus station to allow the public to pay their final respects until 8p.m. that evening.

On 30 July 2015, the former president was laid to rest at Rameswaram's Pei Karumbu Ground with full state honours. Over 350,000 people attended the last rites, including the Prime Minister, the governor of Tamil Nadu and the chief ministers of Karnataka, Kerala and Andhra Pradesh.

Reactions 

India reacted to Kalam's death with an outpouring of grief; numerous tributes were paid to the former president across the nation and on social media. The Government of India declared a seven-day state mourning period as a mark of respect. President Pranab Mukherjee, Vice-president Hamid Ansari, Home Minister Rajnath Singh, and other leaders condoled the former President's demise. Prime Minister Narendra Modi said "Kalam's death is a great loss to the scientific community. He took India to great heights. He showed the way." Former Prime Minister Dr Manmohan Singh, who had served as prime minister under Kalam, said, "our country has lost a great human being who made phenomenal contributions to the promotion of self-reliance in defence technologies. I worked very closely with Dr. Kalam as prime minister and I greatly benefited from his advice as president of our country. His life and work will be remembered for generations to come." ISRO chairman A. S. Kiran Kumar called his former colleague "a great personality and a gentleman", while former chairman G. Madhavan Nair described Kalam as "a global leader" for whom "the downtrodden and poor people were his priority. He always had a passion to convey what is in his mind to the young generation", adding that his death left a vacuum which none could fill.

South Asian leaders expressed condolences and lauded the late statesman. The Bhutanese government ordered the country's flags to fly at half-staff to mourn Kalam's death and lit 1000 butter lamps in homage. Bhutanese Prime Minister Tshering Tobgay expressed deep sadness, saying Kalam "was a leader greatly admired by all people, especially the youth of India who have referred to him as the people's President". Bangladesh Prime Minister Sheikh Hasina described Kalam as "a rare combination of a great statesman, acclaimed scientist, and a source of inspiration to the young generation of South Asia" and termed his death an "irreparable loss to India and beyond". Bangladesh Nationalist Party chief Khaleda Zia said "as a nuclear scientist, he engaged himself in the welfare of the people". Ashraf Ghani, the President of Afghanistan, called Kalam "an inspirational figure to millions of people," noting that "we have a lot to learn from his life". Nepalese Prime Minister Sushil Koirala recalled Kalam's scientific contributions to India: "Nepal has lost a good friend and I have lost an honoured and ideal personality." The President of Pakistan, Mamnoon Hussain, and Prime Minister of Pakistan Nawaz Sharif also expressed their grief and condolences on his death. The President of Sri Lanka, Maithripala Sirisena, also expressed his condolences. "Dr. Kalam was a man of firm conviction and indomitable spirit, and I saw him as an outstanding statesman of the world. His death is an irreparable loss not only to India but to the entire world." Maldivian President Abdulla Yameen and Vice-president Ahmed Adeeb condoled Kalam's death, with Yameen naming him as a close friend of the Maldives who would continue to be an inspiration to Indians and generations of South Asians. Former President Maumoon Abdul Gayoom, who had made an official visit to India during Kalam's presidency, termed his demise as a great loss to all of humankind. The Commander-in-Chief of the Myanmar Armed Forces, Senior General Min Aung Hlaing, expressed condolences on behalf of the Myanmar government. The Dalai Lama expressed his sadness and offered condolences and prayers, calling Kalam's death "an irreparable loss".

Kathleen Wynne, the Premier of Ontario, which Kalam had visited on numerous occasions, expressed "deepest condolences ... as a respected scientist, he played a critical role in the development of the Indian space programme. As a committed educator, he inspired millions of young people to achieve their very best. And as a devoted leader, he gained support both at home and abroad, becoming known as 'the people's President'. I join our IndoCanadian families, friends, and neighbours in mourning the passing of this respected leader." United States President Barack Obama extended "deepest condolences to the people of India on the passing of former Indian President Dr. APJ Abdul Kalam", and highlighted his achievements as a scientist and as a statesman, notably his role in strengthening US–India relations and increasing space co-operation between the two nations. "Suitably named 'the People's President', Dr. Kalam's humility and dedication to public service served as an inspiration to millions of Indians and admirers around the world."
Russian President Vladimir Putin expressed sincere condolences and conveyed his sympathy and support "to the near and dear ones of the deceased leader, to the government, and entire people of India". He remarked on Kalam's outstanding "personal contribution to the social, economic, scientific, and technical progress of India and in ensuring its national security," adding that Kalam would be remembered as a "consistent exponent of closer friendly relations between our nations, who has done a lot for cementing mutually beneficial RussianIndian cooperation." Other international leaders—including former Indonesian president Susilo Bambang Yudhoyono, Malaysian Prime Minister Najib Razak, Singaporean Prime Minister Lee Hsien Loong, President of the United Arab Emirates Sheikh Khalifa bin Zayed Al Nahyan, and vice-president and Prime Minister of the United Arab Emirates and emir of Dubai Sheikh Mohammed bin Rashid Al Maktoum—also paid tribute to Kalam. In a special gesture, Secretary-General of the United Nations Ban Ki-moon visited the Permanent Mission of India to the UN and signed a condolence book. "The outpouring of grief around the world is a testament of the respect and inspiration he has garnered during and after his presidency. The UN joins the people of India in sending our deepest condolences for this great statesman. May he rest in peace and eternity", Ban wrote in his message.

Memorial 
The Dr. A. P. J. Abdul Kalam National Memorial was built in memory of Kalam by the DRDO in Pei Karumbu, in the island town of Rameswaram, Tamil Nadu. It was inaugurated by Prime Minister Narendra Modi in July 2017. On display are the replicas of rockets and missiles which Kalam had worked with. Acrylic paintings about his life are also displayed along with hundreds of portraits depicting the life of the mass leader. There is a statue of Kalam in the entrance showing him playing the Veena. There are two other smaller statues of the leader in sitting and standing posture.

Personal life 
Kalam was the youngest of five siblings, the eldest of whom was a sister, Asim Zohra, followed by three elder brothers: Mohammed Muthu Meera Lebbai Maraikayar (5 November 1916 – 7 March 2021), Mustafa Kalam and Kasim Mohammed. He was extremely close to his elder siblings and their extended families throughout his life, and would regularly send small sums of money to his older relations, himself remaining a lifelong bachelor.

Kalam was noted for his integrity and his simple lifestyle. He never owned a television, and was in the habit of rising at 6:30 or 7a.m. and sleeping by 2a.m. His few personal possessions included his books, his veena, some articles of clothing, a CD player and a laptop; at his death, he left no will, and his possessions went to his eldest brother, who survived him.

Religious and spiritual views 
Religion and spirituality were very important to Kalam throughout his life. He made his own spiritual journey the subject of his final book, Transcendence: My Spiritual Experiences with Pramukh Swamiji.

Islam 

A proud and practising Muslim, daily namaz and fasting during Ramadan were integral to Kalam's life. His father, the imam of a mosque in his hometown of Rameswaram, had strictly instilled these Islamic customs in his children. His father had also impressed upon the young Kalam the value of interfaith respect and dialogue. As Kalam recalled: "Every evening, my father A. P. Jainulabdeen, an imam, Pakshi Lakshmana Sastry, the head priest of the Ramanathaswamy Hindu temple, and a church priest used to sit with hot tea and discuss the issues concerning the island." Such early exposure convinced Kalam that the answers to India's multitudinous issues lay in "dialogue and cooperation" among the country's religious, social, and political leaders. Moreover, since Kalam believed that "respect for other faiths" was one of the key cornerstones of Islam, he was fond of saying: "For great men, religion is a way of making friends; small people make religion a fighting tool."

Syncretism 
One component of Kalam's widespread popularity among diverse groups in India, and an enduring aspect of his legacy, is the syncretism he embodied in appreciating various elements of the many spiritual and cultural traditions of India. In addition to his faith in the Quran and Islamic practice, Kalam was well-versed in Hindu traditions; he learnt Sanskrit, read the Bhagavad Gita and he was a vegetarian. Kalam also enjoyed writing Tamil poetry, playing the veena (an Indian string instrument), and listening to Carnatic devotional music every day. In 2002, in one of his early speeches to Parliament after becoming president, he reiterated his desire for a more united India, stating that "during the last one year I met a number of spiritual leaders of all religions ... and I would like to endeavour to work for bringing about unity of minds among the divergent traditions of our country". Describing Kalam as a unifier of diverse traditions, Congress leader Shashi Tharoor stated, "Kalam was a complete Indian, an embodiment of the eclecticism of India's heritage of diversity". BJP leader L. K. Advani concurred that Kalam was "the best exemplar of the Idea of India, one who embodied the best of all the cultural and spiritual traditions that signify India's unity in immense diversity. This was most strikingly evident in the second-to-last book he published, presciently titled Transcendence: My Spiritual Experiences with Pramukh Swami".

Pramukh Swami as Guru 
Kalam's desire to meet spiritual leaders to help create a more prosperous, spiritual, and unified India was what initially led him to meet Pramukh Swami, the Hindu guru of the BAPS Swaminarayan Sampradaya, who Kalam would come to consider his ultimate spiritual teacher and guru. The first of eight meetings between Kalam and Pramukh Swami over a fourteen-year period took place on 30 June 2001, in New Delhi, during which Kalam described being immediately drawn to Pramukh Swami's simplicity and spiritual purity. Kalam stated that he was inspired by Pramukh Swami throughout their numerous interactions. One such incident occurred the day following the terrorist attack on BAPS' Akshardham, Gandhinagar complex in September 2002; Pramukh Swami prayed for, and sprinkled holy water upon, the sites of all of the deceased, including the terrorists, demonstrating the view that all human life is sacred. Kalam recalled being moved by Pramukh Swami's equanimity and compassion, citing this incident as one of his motivations for writing Transcendence: My Spiritual Experiences with Pramukh Swamiji. Summarising the effect that Pramukh Swami had on him, Kalam stated that "[Pramukh Swami] has indeed transformed me. He is the ultimate stage of the spiritual ascent in my life ... Pramukh Swamiji has put me in a God-synchronous orbit. No manoeuvres are required any more, as I am placed in my final position in eternity." Following Kalam's death a month after his final book was released, co-author Arun Tiwari pointed to this passage as potentially prophetic and premonitory of Kalam's death.

Writings 

In his book India 2020, Kalam strongly advocated an action plan to develop India into a "knowledge superpower" and a developed nation by 2020. He regarded his work on India's nuclear weapons programme as a way to assert India's place as a future superpower.

Kalam describes a "transformative moment" in his life when he asked Pramukh Swami, the guru of the BAPS Swaminarayan Sampradaya, how India might realise this five-pronged vision of development.  Pramukh Swami's answer—to add a sixth area developing faith in God and spirituality to overcome the current climate of crime and corruption—became the spiritual vision for the next 15 years Kalam's life, which he describes in his final book, Transcendence: My Spiritual Experiences with Pramukh Swamiji, published just a month before his death.

It was reported that there was considerable demand in South Korea for translated versions of books authored by him.

Kalam took an active interest in other developments in the field of science and technology, including a research programme for developing biomedical implants. He also supported open source technology over proprietary software, predicting that the use of free software on a large scale would bring the benefits of information technology to more people.

Kalam set a target of interacting with 100,000 students during the two years after his resignation from the post of scientific adviser in 1999. He explained, "I feel comfortable in the company of young people, particularly high school students. Henceforth, I intend to share with them experiences, helping them to ignite their imagination and preparing them to work for a developed India for which the road map is already available." His dream is to let every student to light up the sky with victory using their latent fire in the heart.

Awards and honours 

Kalam received 7 honorary doctorates from 40 universities. The Government of India honoured him with the Padma Bhushan in 1981 and the Padma Vibhushan in 1990 for his work with ISRO and DRDO and his role as a scientific advisor to the Government. In 1997, Kalam received India's highest civilian honour, the Bharat Ratna, for his contribution to the scientific research and modernisation of defence technology in India. In 2013, he was the recipient of the Von Braun Award from the National Space Society "to recognize excellence in the management and leadership of a space-related project".

In 2012, Kalam was ranked number 2 in Outlook India's poll of the Greatest Indian.

Following his death, Kalam received numerous tributes. The award will be awarded annually on Independence Day, beginning in 2015, to residents of the state with achievements in promoting scientific growth, the humanities or the welfare of students.

On the anniversary of Kalam's birth in 2015 the CBSE set topics on his name in the CBSE expression series.

Prime Minister Narendra Modi ceremonially released postage stamps commemorating Kalam at DRDO Bhawan in New Delhi on 15 October 2015, the 84th anniversary of Kalam's birth.

Researchers at the NASA's Jet Propulsion Laboratory (JPL) had discovered a new bacterium on the filters of the International Space Station (ISS) and named it Solibacillus kalamii to honour the late president Dr. A. P. J. Abdul Kalam.

Several educational and scientific institutions and other locations were renamed or named in honour of Kalam following his death.

 Kerala Technological University, headquartered at Thiruvananthapuram where Kalam lived for years, was renamed to A P J Abdul Kalam Technological University after his death.
 An agricultural college at Kishanganj, Bihar, was renamed the "Dr. Kalam Agricultural College, Kishanganj" by the Bihar state government on the day of Kalam's funeral. The state government also announced it would name a proposed science city after Kalam.
 India's First Medical Tech Institute named as Kalam Institute of Health Technology located at Visakhapatnam.
 Uttar Pradesh Technical University (UPTU) was renamed A. P. J. Abdul Kalam Technical University by the Uttar Pradesh state government.
 A. P. J. Abdul Kalam Memorial Travancore Institute of Digestive Diseases, a new research institute in Kollam city, Kerala attached to the Travancore Medical College Hospital.
 A new academic complex at Mahatma Gandhi University in Kerala.
 Construction of Dr. A. P. J. Abdul Kalam Science City started in Patna in February 2019.
 A new science centre and planetarium in Lawspet, Puducherry.
 India and the US have launched the Fulbright-Kalam Climate Fellowship in September 2014. The first call for applicants was announced on Friday, 12 March 2016, for the fellowship which will enable up to 6 Indian PhD students and post-doctoral researchers to work with US host institutions for a period of 6–12 months. The fellowship will be operated by the binational US-India Educational Foundation (USIEF) under the Fulbright programme.
Dr APJ Abdul Kalam Planetarium in Burla, Sambalpur, Odisha was named after him.

Island 
Wheeler Island, a national missile test site in Odisha, was renamed Abdul Kalam Island in September 2015.

Road 
A prominent road in New Delhi was renamed from Aurangzeb Road to Dr APJ Abdul Kalam Road in August 2015.

Plant species 
In February 2018, scientists from the Botanical Survey of India named a newly found plant species as Drypetes kalamii, in his honour.

Other awards and honours

Legacy

Books, documentaries and popular culture 
Kalam's writings
Developments in Fluid Mechanics and Space Technology by A P J Abdul Kalam and Roddam Narasimha; Indian Academy of Sciences, 1988.
 India 2020: A Vision for the New Millennium by A P J Abdul Kalam, Y. S. Rajan; New York, 1998.
 Wings of Fire: An Autobiography by A P J Abdul Kalam, Arun Tiwari; Universities Press, 1999.
 Ignited Minds: Unleashing the Power Within India by A P J Abdul Kalam; Viking, 2002.
 The Luminous Sparks by A P J Abdul Kalam, by; Punya Publishing Pvt Ltd., 2004.
 Mission India by A P J Abdul Kalam, Paintings by Manav Gupta; Penguin Books, 2005
 Inspiring Thoughts by A P J Abdul Kalam; Rajpal & Sons, 2007
 Indomitable Spirit by A P J Abdul Kalam; Rajpal & Sons Publishing
 Envisioning an Empowered Nation by A P J Abdul Kalam with A Sivathanu Pillai; Tata McGraw-Hill, New Delhi
 You Are Born To Blossom: Take My Journey Beyond by A P J Abdul Kalam and Arun Tiwari; Ocean Books, 2011.
 Turning Points: A journey through challenges by A P J Abdul Kalam; HarperCollins India, 2012.
 Target 3 Billion by A P J Abdul Kalam and Srijan Pal Singh; December 2011 (Publisher: Penguin Books).
 My Journey: Transforming Dreams into Actions by A P J Abdul Kalam; 2014 by the Rupa Publication.
 A Manifesto for Change: A Sequel to India 2020 by A P J Abdul Kalam and V Ponraj; July 2014 by HarperCollins.
 Forge your Future: Candid, Forthright, Inspiring by A P J Abdul Kalam; by Rajpal & Sons, 29 October 2014.
 Reignited: Scientific Pathways to a Brighter Future by A P J Abdul Kalam and Srijan Pal Singh; by Penguin India, 14 May 2015.
 Transcendence: My Spiritual Experiences with Pramukh Swamiji by A P J Abdul Kalam with Arun Tiwari; HarperCollins Publishers, June 2015
 Advantage India: From Challenge to Opportunity by A P J Abdul Kalam and Srijan Pal Singh; HarperCollins Publishers,15 October 2015.

Biographies
 Eternal Quest: Life and Times of Dr Kalam by S Chandra; Pentagon Publishers, 2002.
 President A P J Abdul Kalam by R K Pruthi; Anmol Publications, 2002.
 A P J Abdul Kalam: The Visionary of India by K Bhushan, G Katyal; A P H Pub Corp, 2002.
 A Little Dream (documentary film) by P. Dhanapal; Minveli Media Works Private Limited, 2008.
 The Kalam Effect: My Years with the President by P M Nair; HarperCollins, 2008.
 My Days With Mahatma Abdul Kalam by Fr A K George; Novel Corporation, 2009.
A.P.J. Abdul Kalam: A Life by Arun Tiwari; Harper Collins, 2015.
The People's President: Dr A P J Abdul Kalam by S M Khan; Bloomsbury Publishing, 2016.

Popular culture
 In the 2011 Hindi film I Am Kalam, Kalam is portrayed as a positive influence on a poor but bright Rajasthani boy named Chhotu, who renames himself Kalam in honour of his idol. My Hero Kalam is a 2018 Indian Kannada-language biographical film by Shivu Hiremath which portrays his life from childhood to the Pokhran tests.
 People's President is a 2016 Indian documentary feature film directed by Pankaj Vyas which covers the life of Kalam. It was produced by the Government of India's Films Division.
 Mega Icons (2018–2020), a documentary television series about prominent personalities of India which aired on National Geographic, based the third episode – "APJ Abdul Kalam" – on Kalam's life and his ascendancy to India's presidency.
 Soorarai Pottru, a 2020 film about the Indian aviation industry had a look-alike of Kalam, Sheik Maideen, portraying him.
Rocket Boys, an Indian Hindi-language Biographical streaming television series on SonyLIV. The character of Kalam was played by Arjun Radhakrishnan.

See also 
 2002 Indian presidential election
 List of presidents of India
 Pokhran-II
 The Greatest Indian

References 
Footnotes

Citations

External links 

 Official website
 Website of Dr. APJ Abdul Kalam during his tenureship as the President of India, hosted by the National Informatics Centre
 

 
1931 births
2015 deaths
Defence Research and Development Organisation
Indian aerospace engineers
Indian Space Research Organisation people
21st-century Indian Muslims
Madras Institute of Technology alumni
People from Ramanathapuram district
Recipients of the Bharat Ratna
Recipients of the Padma Bhushan in civil service
Presidents of India
Engineers from Tamil Nadu
Tamil engineers
Tamil poets
University of Madras alumni
St Joseph's College, Tiruchirappalli alumni
Nuclear power in India
Recipients of the Padma Vibhushan in science & engineering
Fellows of the National Academy of Medical Sciences
20th-century Indian engineers
20th-century Indian politicians
21st-century Indian engineers
Indian Tamil academics
Indian Tamil politicians
21st-century Indian politicians
People associated with Shillong
People associated with solar power
Academic staff of the International Institute of Information Technology, Hyderabad